El Ashash is a 2013 Egyptian drama film written by Mohamed Samir Mabrouk, produced by Walid Al Kurdi, and directed by Ismael Farouk.

Plot
A little boy (Mohamed Farag) gets lost and is being raised by a worker in an orphanage. Growing up, his life is otherwise normal until he is accused of killing someone.  He decides to run away and prove his innocence. He meets a Shaabi belly dancer (Horeya Farghaly) who helps him to escape.

Cast

 Mohamed Farag
 Horeya Farghaly
 Dalal Abdel Aziz
 Marwa Adbelmenem
 Soleiman Eid
 Ihab Fahmi
 Hassan Hosny
 Heba Magdy
 Hanan Metaweh
 Alaa Morsy
 Hanan Youssef

References

External links
 (defunct)

2013 films
2013 drama films
Egyptian drama films
2010s Arabic-language films